Marion Platten (born 25 November 1958) is a German former swimmer. She competed in three events at the 1976 Summer Olympics. The FRG team for the 200m freestyle included Regina Nissen, Jutta Weber and Platten.

References

External links
 

1958 births
Living people
German female swimmers
Olympic swimmers of West Germany
Swimmers at the 1976 Summer Olympics
Sportspeople from Düsseldorf
20th-century German women
21st-century German women